The Defiance Public Library is a historic Carnegie library located in Defiance, Ohio.  It was built in 1904 with funds from Andrew Carnegie and was designed by architects Wing & Mahurin. The Tudor Revival-style building includes stained glass, a red sandstone facade, and picture windows overlooking the junction the Maumee and Auglaize Rivers and of the Defiance Fort Grounds.  The building was listed on the National Register of Historic Places in 1985.

References

Library buildings completed in 1904
Libraries on the National Register of Historic Places in Ohio
Tudor Revival architecture in Ohio
Buildings and structures in Defiance County, Ohio
National Register of Historic Places in Defiance County, Ohio
Public Library